Mawsonite is a brownish orange sulfosalt mineral, containing copper, iron, tin, and sulfur: Cu6Fe2SnS8.

Discovery and occurrence
It was first described in 1965 for occurrences in the Royal George mine, Swinton, Tingha, Hardinge County, New South Wales; and the North Lyell mine, Mount Lyell Mine, Queenstown, Tasmania.

It was named after Australian geologist and Antarctic explorer, Sir Douglas Mawson (1882–1958). It occurs within hydrothermal copper deposits in altered volcanic rocks. It also occurs in skarn deposits and as disseminations in altered granites. It occurs in association with bornite, pyrite, chalcopyrite, chalcocite, digenite, idaite, stannite, stannoidite, pyrrhotite, pentlandite, tennantite, enargite, luzonite–famatinite, kiddcreekite, mohite, native bismuth, galena and sphalerite.

References 

Sulfosalt minerals
Tetragonal minerals
Minerals in space group 115